David Němeček is a Czech ice hockey player who plays for HC Sparta in Extraliga.

Career
In 2020 in a game against Ässät David Němeček got a 7-game ban from Liiga after his shoulder hit Otto Kivenmäki in the head. Kivenmäki's helmet came off and he hit his head in the ice causing mild brain damage (has already healed).

References

Living people
1995 births
Sportspeople from Plzeň
Czech ice hockey defencemen
Czech expatriate ice hockey players in Canada
Czech expatriate ice hockey players in Finland
Czech expatriate ice hockey players in the United States
BK Mladá Boleslav players
HC Sparta Praha players
HC Plzeň players
Lukko players
Cedar Rapids RoughRiders players
Saskatoon Blades players
Sarnia Sting players
HC TPS players